Hung Yen University of Technology and Education is a government-funded university in Hưng Yên Province, Vietnam.

Hung Yen University of Technology and Education is one of the national technical pedagogy universities with high quality application-oriented training to meet the increasingly diverse needs of society in terms of labor resources. The University is tasked with training PhDs, masters, bachelors of science (engineers), bachelors of arts (BA) and technical teachers, with key research directions on Automation Technology, Mechatronics Technology, Manufacturing Technology, Automotive Engineering Technology, Material Technology (Nano), Biotechnology, and Information Technology

History 
On December 21, 1966, Hung Yen Industrial High School under the Ministry of Heavy Industry was established under Decision No. 1265 / BCNNg / KH of the Ministry of Heavy Industry.

On December 3, 1970, the School belonged to the General Department of Technical Workers Training, Ministry of Labor with the name of Vocational School, with the task of training vocational teachers for Technical Workers' schools and vocational training institutions.

On March 5, 1979, the school was upgraded to Technical Education College I of the General Department of Vocational Training according to Decision No. 80 / TTg of the Prime Minister.

From July 1, 1987,  the school was directly under the Ministry of Education and Training.

On 6/1/2003, the school was upgraded to Hung Yen University of Technical Education through Decision No. 04/2003 / QD-TTg, a public school directly under the Ministry of Education and Training

Location 

 Headquarters: Dan Tien Commune, Khoai Chau District, Hung Yen Province, Vietnam.
 My Hao Campus: Nhan Hoa Ward, My Hao Town, Hung Yen Province, Vietnam.
 Hai Duong Campus: 68 Do Ngoc Du, Tan Binh Ward, Hai Duong City, Hai Duong Province, Vietnam

Governance 

 President: Assoc. Prof. Dr. Bui Trung Thanh
 Vice Presidents: Assoc. Prof. Dr. Chu Van Tuan; Assoc. Prof. Dr. Truong Ngoc Tuan; MSc. Nguyen Duc Giang.
 Chair of University Council: Dr. Nguyen Minh Quy

Training areas 
Hung Yen University of Technology and Education is currently training 29 university majors, 8 master's and 2 doctoral degrees, namely:

PhD programs:

1. Mechanical engineering;

2. Electronic engineering

Masters:

1. Mechanical engineering;

2. Electronic engineering;

3. Control engineering and automation;

4. Electrical engineering (intensive Electrical System);

5. Information technology;

6. Chemical engineering;

7. Automobile engineering;

8. Business administration.

Bachelors:

Information Technology

 Computer technology
 Computer networks and communications
 Software engineering

Electrical and Electronics Engineering

 Industrial automation
 Industrial electronics
 Electrical system
 Electronics and telecommunications
 Automatic control

Mechanical Engineering

 Welding technology
 Computer-Aided mechanical technology designs

Mechatronics engineering technology

 Mechatronics engineering 
 Maintenance and Mechatronics Engineering Technology
 Refrigeration Engineering and Air conditioning

Automotive engineering technology

 Automotive engineering technology
 Mechatronics of automobiles and specialized vehicles

Technology pedagogy

Garment technology

 Garment technology
 Fashion Design
 Merchandising

Business administration

 Technology business administration
 Marketing products and services

Accounting (Business accounting)

Economics (Investment economics)

Chemical engineering technology

 Applied chemical engineering
 Production quality management and industrial environment - QA / QC / ISO14001

Environmental technology

 Environmental engineering
 Management of environment and labor safety

English linguistics

Staffs 
Hung Yen University of Technology and Education is an application-oriented training university. With the motto: the teaching staff decides the quality of the university, so the development and training of staff is a top important task

Total number of staff (as of September 2018): 602 people. Specifically, there are 04 Professors, 33 Associate Professors, 93 PhDs, 132 PhDs, 246 Masters, 4 Master's students, 47 bachelors and other qualifications: 43.

In which the teaching team consists of 459 people, including 04 Professors, 33 Associate Professors, 93 PhDs, 130 PhDs, 196 Masters, 03 Master's students

Awarded achievements 
International Robocon Championship Asia - Pacific (2015); 1 first prize, 3 second prizes, 3 third prizes in national Robocon contest, the best Manual Robot prizes, The team has the best technology solution; 01 second prize, 10 third prizes and more than 20 consolation prizes for the National Olympiad in Mechanics; 01 second prize, 04 third prizes and 02 consolation prizes for Mathematical Olympiad; 08 National Informatics Olympiad; 03 second prizes, 09 third prizes and 0 consolation prizes for the Olympic Physics; 02 third prizes, 03 consolation prizes in Chemistry Olympiad; First prize in the Vietnam Creative Contest with Intel Galileo 2015 with the "Smart Wheelchair" project; 01 second prize and 03 third prizes in the contest "Saving fuel driving" by HonDa; 06 prizes for female IT students, typical technical female students, 1 January Star award.

Faculties 
Currently the University has 11 faculties and 1 division

Faculty of Mechanical Engineering
Faculty of Automotive Technology
Faculty of Electronics – Electrical Engineering
Faculty of Information Technology
Faculty of Technical Education
Faculty of Basic Science
Faculty of Garment Technology and Fashion Design
Faculty of Foreign languages
Faculty of Economics
Faculty of Political Theory
Faculty of Chemical Technology and Environment
Division of Physical Education & Defense

Departments – Centers – Campuses 

 Department of Human Resource
 Department of Academic Affairs
 Department of Financial Accounting
 Department of Administration 
 Department of Inspection and Legal Issues
 Department of Student Affairs
 Department of Science and Technology Management and International Cooperation
 Department of Equipment and Construction
 Department of Quality Assurance 
 Center for Admissions and Communications
 Library Information Center
 My Hao campus
 Hai Duong campus

Contacts 

 Official website of Hung Yen University of Technical Education
 Official fanpage of Hung Yen University of Technical Education
 Contact information: Center for Admissions and Communications;

Universities in Vietnam